The Northern Avenue Bridge, also known as the Old Northern Avenue Bridge, is a bridge that spans Fort Point Channel Boston, Massachusetts. Built in 1908, it was closed to vehicle traffic in 1997 and operated as a pedestrian bridge until December 2014 when it was closed after inspectors found that thirteen floor beams were unsafe for pedestrians. In an October 26, 2015 letter, the Coast Guard informed the City of Boston that the bridge was a 'hazard to navigation' due to the risk of it falling into the Fort Point Channel and requested removal of its most vulnerable portion. The center span of the truss also carried a single track for the Union Freight Railroad, although it was designed for two tracks. From 1912 to 1948, the bridge abutted a floating firehouse for Engine 44 of the Boston Fire Department. Following its closure as a road bridge, various redevelopment schemes have been proposed for the bridge, as well as outright demolition of the span.

Replacement
On January 20, 2016, the Boston Globe reported that the City of Boston will spend $100 million to reopen the bridge, as part of its agreement to bring General Electric's headquarters to the South Boston Waterfront. Two days later, the Globe reported that the bridge would instead be removed, and possibly replaced.

Later in the spring, the City of Boston and the Boston Society of Architects sponsored an "ideas competition" for reconstruction or replacement of the bridge.

In December 2019, city officials announced that the bridge would be rebuilt for use solely by pedestrians and bicyclists.

Updated plans were announced in May 2020; design was expected to be finalized by the end of 2020 and construction to begin in 2021. However, the project was delayed due to the COVID-19 pandemic and the resignation of Mayor Marty Walsh.

See also
List of bridges documented by the Historic American Engineering Record in Massachusetts

References

External links

City of Boston website about the bridge reconstruction project

Information on the bridge
Proposals for bridge rehabilitation or outright demolition

Road bridges in Massachusetts
Railroad bridges in Massachusetts
Bridges in Boston
Bridges completed in 1908
Historic American Engineering Record in Massachusetts
1908 establishments in Massachusetts
Truss bridges in the United States
Metal bridges in the United States